Thahe Mohammed Sabbar (born about 1968) is an Iraqi citizen detained by the United States military for approximately six months from July 2003 to January 2004.

He was detained in, among other places, Abu Ghraib prison, where he says he was tortured.

References

1960s births
Living people